Philotheca myoporoides, commonly known as long-leaf wax flower, is a species of flowering plant in the family Rutaceae and is endemic to south-eastern Australia. It is a shrub with sessile, oblong to egg-shaped, glandular-warty leaves and white to pink flowers arranged singly in leaf axils. Prior to 1998 it was known as Eriostemon myoporoides.

Description

Taxonomy
This species was first formally described in 1824 by Swiss botanist Augustin Pyramus de Candolle who gave it the name Eriostemon myoporoides in his book Prodromus Systematis Naturalis Regni Vegetabilis. In 1998 Michael James Bayly changed the name to Philotheca myoporoides in the journal Muelleria.

In the same journal, Bayly described nine subspecies, four of which are accepted by the Australian Plant Census, and in 2001, Andrew Rozefelds described a fifth subspecies:
 Philotheca myoporoides (DC.)

Distribution and habitat
Subspecies acuta grows on rocky sandstone hills from Lockhart to near Cobar. Subspecies brevipedunculata is found coastal areas to mountain summits between Sassafras and Moruya in south-eastern New South Wales. Subspecies euroensis grows among granite boulders on the Strathbogie Ranges near Euroa in north-eastern Victoria. Subspecies myoporoides grows in forest and heathland, usually near watercourses, mostly along the Great Dividing Range from the northern border of New South Wales to near Healesville in Victoria. Subspecies petraea is only known from rocky areas on Mount Stewart, west of Gelantipy in north-eastern Victoria.

Ecology
Caterpillars of the orchard butterfly feed on this species.

Use in horticulture
The species is well adapted to cultivation, and plants are commercially available at nurseries in Australia. 
The species prefers a well-drained position in light shade. Established plants tolerate both dry periods and moderate frost. Plants may be propagated from semi-mature cuttings, though some forms are slow to take root.

References

myoporoides
Flora of New South Wales
Flora of Victoria (Australia)
Sapindales of Australia
Taxa named by Augustin Pyramus de Candolle
Plants described in 1824